Alvaro Moscoso (1493 – 1564) was a Roman Catholic prelate who served as Bishop of Zamora (1561–1564) and Bishop of Pamplona (1550–1561).

Biography
Alvaro Moscoso was born in Cáceres, Spain in 1493.
On 27 June 1550, he was appointed during the papacy of Pope Julius III as Bishop of Pamplona.
On 2 June 1561, he was appointed during the papacy of Pope Pius IV as Bishop of Zamora.
He served as Bishop of Zamora until his death in 1564.

References

External links and additional sources
 (for Chronology of Bishops) 
 (for Chronology of Bishops) 

16th-century Roman Catholic bishops in Spain
Bishops appointed by Pope Julius III
Bishops appointed by Pope Pius IV
1493 births
1564 deaths